Love Under the Olive Tree is a Canadian television film directed by Peter DeLuise and written by Samantha Herman, with a story by Jenna Milly and Ann Marie Allison. The cast includes Tori Anderson, Benjamin Hollingsworth, and Shawn Roberts. It premiered on the Hallmark Channel on June 20, 2020.

Plot

A conflict arises between two local olive oil ranches. Nicole Cabella is determined to prove the opponent Jake Brandini her family's recipe is award-worthy. But what if these two fall in love?.

Cast
 Tori Anderson as Nicole Cabella
 Benjamin Hollingsworth as Jake Brandini
 Shawn Roberts as Adam Caulfield
 Gardiner Millar as Frank Cabella
 Hrothgar Mathews as Tom Cabella
 Andrew Dunbar as Billy Stevens
 Laura Drummond as Gloria Cabella
 Jerry Wasserman as Raphael Brandini
 Barry W. Levy as Maxwel Brandini (credited as Barry Levy)
 Robyn Bradley as Eleanor Brandini

Production
The movie was shot in British Columbia, Canada, in July and August 2019. One specific location was the Milsean Shoppe in Aldergrove, BC. It was originally scheduled to be released in September 2019 but the premiere was postponed. Love Under the Olive Tree explores two evolving relationships: one that is heterosexual, and the other one between a same-sex couple (Shawn Roberts and Andrew Dunbar). Roberts portrays Adam Caulfield, the lead character's gay best friend and her co-worker. According to the actor, the gay subplot was handled in the script in "the most natural and authentic way". Roberts went on to say: "I'd never seen that in any other scripts before. It wasn’t a comment one way or another about anything, or what kind of relationships are out there, and without shining a light on things, just have something open and accepting."

Critical reception
In a journal for Fangirl, Interrupted the two lead characters were named "the Montagues and Capulets of the olive oil world", and the movie itself was praised for its inclusion of the LGBT characters. A review for The Best Darn Girls was mostly favorable: "While the conclusion is anticlimactic, the love story still has promise." Albert Nowicki of We'll Always Have the Movies praised the movie for its "charming setting" and "the natural portrayal of a queer relationship". He also believed Roberts' character was a positive gay role model and went on to describe him as a "Bruce Willis type of a man", "with a musculature of a Superman".

References

External links
 
 Love Under the Olive Tree at Hallmark Channel

2020 LGBT-related films
2020 television films
2020 romance films
Canadian LGBT-related television films
Canadian romantic drama films
Canadian drama television films
English-language Canadian films
Films shot in British Columbia
Gay-related films
Hallmark Channel original films
Romance television films
2020 films
Films directed by Peter DeLuise
2020s Canadian films